Freeth's Coffee House, the popular name for the Leicester Arms on the corner of Bell Street and Lease Lane in Birmingham, England, was a tavern and coffee house that operated from 1736 until 1832.

One of the most celebrated meeting places of Georgian England, it was already known during the early eighteenth century as a place for small businessmen and lawyers to conduct business. During the second half of the century, when its landlord was the topical ballad-writer John Freeth, it was at the forefront of the emergence of popular political consciousness in Birmingham, as the host of radical groups such as the Birmingham Book Club, and as the focus for local opposition to the governments of Lord North.

References

Bibliography

History of Birmingham, West Midlands
Coffeehouses and cafés in the United Kingdom
1736 establishments in England
1832 disestablishments in England